Älghult is a locality situated in Uppvidinge Municipality, Kronoberg County, Sweden with 446 inhabitants in 2010.

References 

Populated places in Kronoberg County
Populated places in Uppvidinge Municipality
Värend